Frances O'Roark Dowell is an American author of middle-grade fiction,   including Dovey Coe (2000), The Secret Language of Girls, Shooting the Moon, and Falling In. Her books have received numerous awards, including an Edgar (Dovey Coe), the William Allen White Children's Book Award (Dovey Coe), the Christopher Award (Shooting the Moon), the VOYA Book Award (Where I'd Like to Be), and the Boston Globe-Horn Book Award for Excellence in Children's Fiction, Honor Book (Shooting the Moon).

Dovey Coe has been translated into Chinese, French and German. The Secret Language of Girls has been translated into Polish.

Biography
The daughter of a US Army lawyer, Frances O'Roark Dowell was born in Germany and moved around frequently as a child. After graduating from high school in Texas, she completed undergraduate studies in English at Wake Forest University and a Master of Fine Arts in Creative Writing with a concentration in poetry from the University of Massachusetts Amherst. She lives in Durham, North Carolina with her husband and two sons.

Published works
 Dovey Coe (2000)
Chinese translation: 我不是兇手 (Wo bu shi xiong shou; I'm not the murderer) – Taipei: The Eastern Publishing Co., Ltd, 2002. 
 French translation: Accusée! – Bayard Jeunesse, 2005. 
 German translation: Dunkler Sommer über Indian Creek – Weinheim: Beltz & Gelberg, 2002. 
 Where I'd Like to Be (2003)
 Chicken Boy (2005)
 Shooting the Moon (2008)
 Falling In (2010)
 Ten Miles Past Normal (2011)
 The Second Life of Abigail Walker (2012)
 Anybody Shining (2014)
 Trouble the Water (2016)
 Birds in the Air (2016)

The Secret Language of Girls
 The Secret Language of Girls (2004)
 Polish translation: Sekretny język dziewczyn 
 The Kind of Friends We Used To Be (2009)
 The Sound of Your Voice, Only Really Far Away (2013)

From the Highly Scientific Notebooks of Phineas L. Macguire
 Phineas L. MacGuire ... Erupts!: The First Experiment (2006)
 Phineas L. MacGuire ... Gets Slimed! (2007)
 Phineas L. MacGuire ... Blasts Off! (2008)
 Phineas L. MacGuire ... Gets Cooking! (2012)

 Sam the Man
 Sam the Man and the Chicken Plan (2016)
 Sam the Man and the Rutabaga Plan (2017)

Awards
2001: Edgar Award, Best Children's, Dovey Coe
2003: William Allen White Children's Book Award, 6th–8th Grade, Dovey Coe
2008: Boston Globe-Horn Book Award Honor, Shooting the Moon
2009: Christopher Award, Books for Young People - Ages 10–12, Shooting the Moon

References

External links

Official author website

1964 births
Living people
American women writers
Edgar Award winners
University of Massachusetts Amherst alumni
Wake Forest University alumni
Writers from North Carolina
21st-century American women